The Kaicene Zunxing is a series of light commercial van produced by the Chinese automobile manufacturer Changan Automobile under the Kaicene brand, a commercial vehicle brand by Changan Automobile.

Overview
The Kaicene Zunxing or originally Chana Zunxing was released by Changan Auto on October 23, 2013, with prices between 159,800 yuan and 209,800 yuan.

Power of the Kaicene Zunxing comes from a 2.7 liter DOHC VVT-i engine producing 163hp（120kW）at 4600-5000rpm and 256N·m of torque at 3200rpm.

Controversies
The design of the Kaicene Zunxing is controversial as it heavily resemble the fifth generation Toyota HiAce (H200) with similar body styles and overall vehicle dimensions. The Rely H3 and Rely H5 are among the various Chinese vans from domestic brands that chose to replicate the Toyota HiAce H200 vans with only minor styling differences. Other brands include government owned manufacturers including Rely, Jinbei and Foton.

References

External links 

Chana Zunxing
Cars of China
Minibuses
Cab over vehicles
Vans
Cars introduced in 2013
2010s cars